Mennegoxylon, commonly referred to as snakewood, is a genus of now extinct trees exhibiting a cell structure resembling snake skin when viewed in cross section. Mennegoxylon is found in the Eocene age Yegua Formation of Texas and Louisiana, USA. Specifically, many examples of snakewood have been found in College Station, Texas. 

It has been classified as a genus in the Nyctaginaceae. The type species is Mennegoxylon jonesii. The genus is named for Dr. Alberta Mennega.

References 

Eocene plants
Caryophyllales genera
Nyctaginaceae
Prehistoric angiosperm genera